Vencer el desamor (English: Overcoming Heartbreak) is a Mexican telenovela that aired on Las Estrellas from 12 October 2020 to 19 February 2021. The series is produced by Rosy Ocampo. The series is part of the "Vencer" franchise, whose first production was Vencer el miedo.

It stars an ensemble cast headed by Daniela Romo, Claudia Álvarez, Julia Urbini, Valentina Buzzurro, David Zepeda, Juan Diego Covarrubias, and Emmanuel Palomares.

Plot 
The story revolves around four women, of different ages and social strata, who are forced to live together under the same roof. At first, the coexistence between them is complicated and tense due to their different visions and ways of facing life, but little by little the sisterhood and solidarity prevail when realizing the peculiar bond that exists between them: each one has suffered, in one or otherwise, the absence and abandonment of their respective partners.

Cast

Main 
 Claudia Álvarez as Ariadna López Hernández
 David Zepeda as Álvaro Falcón Albarrán
 Daniela Romo as Bárbara Albarrán de Falcón
 Altair Jarabo as Olga Collado
 Juan Diego Covarrubias as Eduardo Falcón Albarrán
 Emmanuel Palomares as Gael Falcón Albarrán and Rommel Guajardo
 Julia Urbini as Dafne Falcón Miranda
 Valentina Buzzurro as Gemma Corona
 Alfredo Gatica as Cuauhtémoc "Cuau" Vargas
 Issabela Camil as Linda Brown
 Josh Gutiérrez as Néstor Ibarra
 José Elías Moreno Jr. as Joaquín Falcón Ruiz
 Christian de la Campa as Paulo
 Alejandra García as Romina Inunza
 Lourdes Reyes as Josefina Miranda
 Claudia Ríos as Levita Corona
 Raquel Morell as Imelda
 Patricia Martinez as Martha
 Francisco Avendaño as Eugenio
 Bárbara Falconi as Cassandra Ríos
 Ivan Carranza as Humberto
 Paco Luna as Juanjo
 Mildred Feuchter as Ivette
 Gabriela Zas as Yola
 Tizoc Arroyo as Calixto
 Moisés Manzano as Onofre Corona
 Jorge Alberto Bolaños as Silvestre Salmerón
 Iker García Meza as Tadeo Falcón López
 Mía Martínez as Clara María "Clarita" Ibarra Falcón
 Leonardo Daniel as Lino Ferrer 
 Beatriz Moreno as Doña Efigenia "Efi" Cruz
 Mauricio García-Muela as Guillermo "Memo" Estévez
 Ricardo Baranda as Bruno
 Mariana Espinoza as Erika
 Andrés Vásquez as Dimitri "Dimi"
 Axel Araiza as Poncho
 Elena Lizarraga as Elena
 Carlos Bonavides as Father Antero
 Ariane Pellicer as Guadalupe "Lupe" Guajardo
 Marco Treviño as Lino Ferrer

Special guest stars 
 Paulina Goto as Marcela Durán
 Beng Zeng as Marco Arizpe "La Liendre"
 Jonathan Becerra as El Yeison
 Anna Ciocchetti as Refugio

Production 
The telenovela was announced at the NAPTE 2020 event with the working title El ya no vive aquí. In February 2020 it was announced that the production would be part of the "Vencer" franchise. The cast was officially announced on 14 March 2020. Filming was scheduled to begin in April 2020 and the telenovela would premiere on 13 July 2020. However, on 30 March 2020, Televisa announced that it had suspended filming of their telenovelas. Production officially began on 30 June 2020 and concluded on 16 December 2020.

Ratings

Mexico ratings 
 
}}

U.S. ratings 
 
}}

Episodes

Specials

Notes

References

External links 
 

2020 telenovelas
2020s Mexican television series
2020 Mexican television series debuts
2021 Mexican television series endings
Televisa telenovelas
Spanish-language telenovelas
Mexican telenovelas